The French legislative elections took place on 9 and 16 June 2002 to elect the 12th National Assembly of the Fifth Republic, in a context of political crisis.

The Socialist Prime Minister Lionel Jospin announced his political retirement after his elimination at the first round of the 2002 French presidential election. President Jacques Chirac was easily reelected, all the Republican parties having called to block far-right leader Jean-Marie Le Pen. Chirac's conservative supporters created the Union for the Presidential Majority (Union pour la majorité présidentielle or UMP) to prepare for the legislative elections.

The first round of the presidential election was a shock for the two main coalitions. The candidates of the parliamentary right obtained 32% of votes, and the candidates of the "Plural Left" only 27%. In the first polls, for the legislative elections, they were equal.

The UMP campaigned against "cohabitation", which is blamed for causing confusion profitable to the far-right and far-left. Jean-Pierre Raffarin, a relatively low-profile politician who said he would listen to "France at the bottom", was chosen as the party's candidate for Prime Minister.

Without a real leader, and staggered by the results of 21 April, the left was in difficulty. The Socialist chairman François Hollande tried to revive the "Plural Left" under the name of "United Left"; but the effort was undermined by the fact that it did not have a sufficiently concrete programme. Furthermore, the left-wing parties could not motivate their voters against an unrecognized and apparently uncontroversial politician like Raffarin. In addition part of the left-wing electorate did not want a new "cohabitation". Finally, the polls indicated a growing advantage for the Presidential Majority.

The right won the elections and the UMP obtained a large parliamentary majority of 394 seats. For the third time under the Fifth Republic, a party acquired an absolute majority (the "blue surge"). Five months later, it became the Union for a Popular Movement.

On the left, the Socialist Party achieved a better result than at the winning 1997 elections, but its allies were crushed. The far-left returned towards its usual level. In far-right, the National Front lost the half of its 5 May voters.

Opinion polls

Results

|- style="background-color:#E9E9E9;text-align:center;"
! colspan="4" rowspan="2" style="text-align:left;"| Parties and coalitions
! colspan="3"| First round
! colspan="3"| Second round
! colspan="3"| Total
|- style="background-color:#E9E9E9;text-align:center;"
! width="75"| Votes
! width="30"| %
! width="30"| Seats
! width="75"| Votes
! width="30"| %
! width="30"| Seats
! width="30"| Seats
! width="30"| %
|-
| style="background-color:#B9DAFF;border-bottom-style:hidden" rowspan="6"|
| style="background-color:"|
| style="text-align:left;"| Union for a Popular Movement
| UMP
| 8,408,023
| 33.30
| 48
| 10,026,669
| 47.26
| 309
| 357
| 61.87
|-
| style="background-color:"|
| style="text-align:left;"| Union for French Democracy
| UDF
| 1,226,462
| 4.86
| 6
| 832,785
| 3.92
| 23
| 29
| 5.03
|-
| style="background-color:"|
| style="text-align:left;"| Miscellaneous Right
| DVD
| 921,973
| 3.65
| 3
| 274,374
| 1.29
| 5
| 8
| 1.39
|-
| style="background-color:"|
| style="text-align:left;"| Liberal Democracy
| DL
| 104,767
| 0.41
| 1
| –
| –
| 1
| 2
| 0.35
|-
| style="background-color:"|
| style="text-align:left;"| Rally for France
| RPF
| 94,222
| 0.37
| 0
| 61,605
| 0.29
| 2
| 2
| 0.35
|-
| style="background-color:"|
| style="text-align:left;"| Movement for France
| MPF
| 202,831
| 0.80
| 1
| –
| –
| 1
| 1
| 0.17
|- style="background-color:#B9DAFF"
| style="text-align:left;" colspan="4"| Presidential majority (right)
| 10,958,278
| 43.39
| 59
| 11,195,433
| 52.76
| 340
| 399
| 69.15
|-
| style="background-color:#FFC6D5;border-bottom-style:hidden" rowspan="5"|
| style="background-color:"|
| style="text-align:left;"| Socialist Party
| PS
| 6,086,599
| 24.11
| 1
| 7,482,169
| 35.26
| 139
| 140
| 24.26
|-
| style="background-color:"|
| style="text-align:left;"| French Communist Party
| PCF
| 1,216,178
| 4.82
| 0
| 690,807
| 3.26
| 21
| 21
| 3.64
|-
| style="background-color:"|
| style="text-align:left;"| Radical Party of the Left
| PRG
| 388,891
| 1.54
| 0
| 455,360
| 2.15
| 7
| 7
| 1.21
|-
| style="background-color:"|
| style="text-align:left;"| Miscellaneous Left
| DVG
| 275,533
| 1.09
| 0
| 268,715
| 1.27
| 6
| 6
| 1.04
|-
| style="background-color:"|
| style="text-align:left;"| The Greens
| VEC
| 1,138,222
| 4.51
| 0
| 677,933
| 3.19
| 3
| 3
| 0.52
|- style="background-color:#FFC6D5"
| style="text-align:left;" colspan="4"| Parliamentary left
| 9,105,423
| 36.07
| 1
| 9,574,984
| 45.13
| 177
| 178
| 30.85
|-
| style="background-color:"|
| style="text-align:left;" colspan="2"| Miscellaneous
| DIV
| 194,946
| 0.77
| 0
| 13,036
| 0.06
| 1
| 1
| 0.17
|-
| style="background-color:"|
| style="text-align:left;" colspan="2"| National Front
| FN
| 2,862,960
| 11.34
| 0
| 393,205
| 1.85
| 0
| 0
| 0.00
|-
| style="background-color:"|
| style="text-align:left;" colspan="2"| Hunting, Fishing, Nature, Traditions
| CPNT
| 422,448
| 1.67
| 0
| –
| –
| 0
| 0
| 0.00
|-
| style="background-color:"|
| style="text-align:left;" colspan="2"| Revolutionary Communist League
| LCR
| 320,467
| 1.27
| 0
| –
| –
| 0
| 0
| 0.00
|-
| style="background-color:"|
| style="text-align:left;" colspan="2"| Workers' Struggle
| LO
| 301,984
| 1.20
| 0
| –
| –
| 0
| 0
| 0.00
|-
| style="background-color:"|
| style="text-align:left;" colspan="2"| Republican Pole
| PR
| 299,897
| 1.19
| 0
| 12,679
| 0.06
| 0
| 0
| 0.00
|-
| style="background-color:#77ff77;"|
| style="text-align:left;" colspan="2"| Ecologists
| ECO
| 295,899
| 1.17
| 0
| –
| –
| 0
| 0
| 0.00
|-
| style="background-color:"|
| style="text-align:left;" colspan="2"| National Republican Movement
| MNR
| 276,376
| 1.09
| 0
| –
| –
| 0
| 0
| 0.00
|-
| style="background-color:#bb0000;"|
| style="text-align:left;" colspan="2"| Far-left
| EXG
| 81,558
| 0.32
| 0
| –
| –
| 0
| 0
| 0.00
|-
| style="background-color:"|
| style="text-align:left;" colspan="2"| Regionalists and separatists
| REG
| 66,240
| 0.26
| 0
| 28,689
| 0.14
| 0
| 0
| 0.00
|-
| style="background-color:#404040;"|
| style="text-align:left;" colspan="2"| Far-right
| EXD
| 59,549
| 0.24
| 0
| –
| –
| 0
| 0
| 0.00
|-
| colspan="12" style="background-color:#E9E9E9"| 
|- style="font-weight:bold;"
| style="text-align:left;" colspan="4"| Total
| 25,246,045
| 100.00
| 60
| 21,221,026
| 100.00
| 517
| 577
| 100.00
|-
| colspan="12" style="background-color:#E9E9E9"| 
|-
| style="text-align:left;" colspan="12"| Abstention: 35.58% (1st round), 39.68% (2nd round)  
|}

12th Assembly by Parliamentary Group

2002
Legislative election
Legislative election